Bandari can refer to:

People with the name
 Bandari (name), list of people with the name

Other uses
 Bandari music, a style of music of Iran
 Bandari dance, a dance style of Iran
 Bandari language, an Iranian language
 Bandari F.C. (Kenya), a Kenyan football club
 Bandari F.C. (Tanzania), a Tanzanian football club

See also
 Bhandari, a surname
 Bandar (disambiguation)